Merseh (also known as Merseh-ye Pā’īn) is a village in Siahkalrud Rural District, Chaboksar District, Rudsar County, Gilan Province, Iran. At the 2006 census, its population was 289, in 96 families.

References 

Populated places in Rudsar County